Leo Richard Ryan (26 August 1913 – 29 December 1972) was an Australian rules footballer who played with Footscray in the Victorian Football League (VFL).. Ryan's career ended after he suffered a serious injury after a collision during the match against Melbourne in Round 17 of the 1941 VFL season.

Notes

External links 

 

1913 births
1972 deaths
Australian rules footballers from Victoria (Australia)
Western Bulldogs players